Fosterella weddelliana is a species of flowering plant in the  Bromeliaceae family. It is endemic to Bolivia.

References

weddelliana
Flora of Bolivia
Taxa named by Adolphe-Théodore Brongniart
Taxa named by John Gilbert Baker
Taxa named by Lyman Bradford Smith